The Beginning Party is a political party in Egypt made up of former members of the NDP.

References

Political parties established in 2011
2011 establishments in Egypt